FK Arendal is a defunct Norwegian football club from Arendal which existed from 2000 to 2008. At its peak it played in the third tier of the Norwegian league system. After its bankruptcy, a new, unrelated club called Arendal Fotball was started.

History 

FK Arendal was founded in 2000 as an umbrella team for the local clubs Arendal BK, FK Favør, IK Grane, Rygene IL, IL Sørfjell, IF Trauma, Øyestad IF and Hisøy IL. FK Arendal replaced Øyestad in the league system from the 2001 season. All the founding clubs still existed, however, and played in the league system – although Favør only had a women's section.

FK Arendal won promotion to the Second Division following a victorious 2003 season. Although relegated after one season, it was promoted back up for the 2007 season. The club was again relegated after only one season.

In 2008 it went bankrupt, and ceased to exist.

Season by season record 

P = Played
W = Games won
D = Games drawn
L = Games lost
F = Goals for
A = Goals against
Pts = Points
Pos = Final position

DQ = Disqualified
QR1 = First Qualifying Round
QR2 = Second Qualifying Round
R1 = Round 1
R2 = Round 2
R3 = Round 3
R4 = Round 4

R5 = Round 5
R6 = Round 6
QF = Quarter-finals
SF = Semi-finals
RU = Runners-up
W = Winners

External links 
 FK Arendal on Facebook

Defunct football clubs in Norway
Association football clubs established in 2000
2000 establishments in Norway
Association football clubs disestablished in 2008
2008 disestablishments in Norway
FK Arendal
FK Arendal